Pavel Vyacheslavovich Korzhavykh (born 6 September 1987) is a Russian martial artist who represents his native country Russia in sport jujitsu (JJIF).

Career 
At age 10 he began sambo and judo in his native village Polyany in Vyborgsky District under the coach Vladimir Podsitkov. He began sport jujitsu during his studying at Saint Petersburg Mining University about 2005 and soon became a member of the young Russian ju-jitsu team.

He was the winner of World Games in Cali from 2013 and is a six-time individual world champion – 2008, 2010, 2011, 2014, 2015, and 2016 in discipline fighting system, 62 kg and 69 kg weight category.

Results

References

1987 births
Living people
Russian martial artists
Sportspeople from Saint Petersburg
World Games gold medalists
World Games silver medalists
Competitors at the 2013 World Games
Competitors at the 2017 World Games
21st-century Russian people